Walter Gonçalves (born June 1, 1998) is a Brazilian Muay Thai fighter. As of November 24, 2022, he is ranked #3 in the ONE Flyweight Muay Thai rankings.

Muay thai career
Gonçalves was booked to face Denkongchai Dabransalakham for the vacant WPMF Lightweight title at the Princess Prathep's birthday event on March 31, 2018. He won the fight by a second-round knockout.

Gonçalves participated in the 2018 Muay Xtreme 60 kg tournament, held on June 1, 2018. He faced Christian Hyatt in the tournament finals, after having beat Singthong by decision in the quarterfinals and Sornpetch SamartPayakaroonGym by decision in the semifinals. Gonçalves captured the Muax Xtreme 60 kg title with a first-round knockout of Hyatt.

Gonçalves made his first WPMF lightweight title defense against Daraek SutaiMuayThai at the TerdthaiOngracha event on July 26, 2018. He won the fight by decision.

Gonçalves faced Chatchai PK.Saenchaimuaythaigym at Top King World Series - TK22 on September 22, 2018. He lost the fight by decision. Gonçalves next faced Pedro Ruiz at Yas Island Muay Thai on November 24, 2018. He won the fight by decision.

Gonçalves challenged the  ONE Muay Thai Flyweight champion Rodtang Jitmuangnon at ONE Championship: Century on October 13, 2019, in his ONE Championship debut. He lost the fight by split decision.

Gonçalves faced Momotaro at ONE Championship: Collision Course 2 on December 25, 2020. He lost the fight by a second-round technical knockout, due to a leg injury sustained during the bout.

Gonçalves was booked to face Jonathan Haggerty in the quarterfinals of the ONE Muay Thai Flyweight Grand Prix at ONE 157 on May 20, 2022. Haggerty withdrew the day before the event, due to health issues, and was replaced by Josue Cruz. Gonçalves won the fight by a first-round technical knockout.

Gonçalves faced Superlek Kiatmuu9 in the quarterfinals of the ONE Muay Thai Flyweight Grand Prix at ONE on Prime Video 1 on August 27, 2022. He lost after getting knocked out with an elbow in the first round.

Titles and achievements

2018 World Professional Muaythai Federation 135 lbs Champion
2018 MX Muay Xtreme -60 kg Champion
2017 P-1 Chang Tournament Champion

Fight record 

|-  style="background:#fbb;"
| 2022-08-27|| Loss ||align=left| Superlek Kiatmuu9 || ONE on Prime Video 1 || Kallang, Singapore || KO (Elbow) || 1 || 1:35
|-
! style=background:white colspan=9 |
|-  style="background:#cfc;"
| 2022-05-20|| Win ||align=left| Josue Cruz ||  ONE 157 || Kallang, Singapore || TKO (Punches) || 1 || 0:35
|-
! style=background:white colspan=9 |
|-  style="background:#fbb;"
| 2020-12-25|| Loss ||align=left| Momotaro || ONE Championship: Collision Course 2 || Kallang, Singapore || TKO (Leg injury)|| 2 || 0:30
|-  style="background:#FFBBBB;"
| 2019-10-13||Loss ||align=left| Rodtang Jitmuangnon || ONE Championship: Century || Tokyo, Japan ||Decision (Split) || 5 ||3:00
|-
! style=background:white colspan=9 |
|-  style="background:#CCFFCC;"
| 2019-03-08||Win ||align=left| Matthew Daalman || Fight Night Dubai || Dubai, United Arab Emirates ||TKO (referee stoppage)|| 3 ||
|-  style="background:#FFBBBB;"
| 2019-02-05||Loss ||align=left| Petsimok PK.saenchai || Lumpinee Stadium || Bangkok, Thailand ||Decision|| 5 || 3:00
|-  style="background:#CCFFCC;"
| 2018-11-24||Win ||align=left| Pedro Ruiz || Yas Island Muay Thai || Abu Dhabi, United Arab Emirates ||Decision|| 5 || 3:00
|-  style="background:#CCFFCC;"
| 2018-11-03||Win ||align=left| Tian Zongyao || Wu Lin Feng 2018: WLF -67kg World Cup 2018-2019 5th Round || China ||KO (Middle Kick)|| 1 || 2:05
|- style="background:#FFBBBB;"
| 2018-09-22|| Loss ||align=left| Chatchai PK.Saenchaimuaythaigym || Top King World Series - TK22 || Ko Samui, Thailand || Decision || 3 || 3:00
|-  style="background:#CCFFCC;"
| 2018-09-01||Win ||align=left| Hao Yijie || Wu Lin Feng 2018: WLF -67kg World Cup 2018-2019 3rd Round || China ||KO (Front Kick)|| 3 ||
|-  style="background:#CCFFCC;"
| 2018-07-26||Win ||align=left| Daraek SutaiMuayThai || TerdthaiOngracha, King's Birthday || Bangkok, Thailand ||Decision || 5 || 3:00
|-
! style=background:white colspan=9 |
|-  style="background:#CCFFCC;"
| 2018-06-16||Win ||align=left| Christian Hyatt || Muay Xtreme, -60 kg Tournament Final || Bangkok, Thailand ||KO (Body Kick)|| 1 ||
|-
! style=background:white colspan=9 |
|-  style="background:#CCFFCC;"
| 2018-06-01||Win ||align=left| Sornpetch SamartPayakaroonGym || Muay Xtreme, -60 kg Tournament Semi Final || Bangkok, Thailand ||Ext.R Decision|| 4 || 3:00
|-  style="background:#CCFFCC;"
| 2018-05-17||Win ||align=left| Singthong || Muay Xtreme, -60 kg Tournament Quarter Final || Bangkok, Thailand ||Decision|| 3 || 3:00
|-  style="background:#CCFFCC;"
| 2018-03-31||Win ||align=left| Denkongchai Dabransalakham || Princess Prathep's birthday || Bangkok, Thailand ||KO (High Kick)|| 2 ||
|-
! style=background:white colspan=9 |
|-  style="background:#CCFFCC;"
| 2018-03-09||Win ||align=left| Mahachai M.U.Den || Muay Xtreme || Thailand ||KO || 2 ||
|-  style="background:#CCFFCC;"
| 2017-12-02||Win ||align=left|  || P-1 Chang Tournament, Final || Thailand ||Decision|| 3 || 3:00
|-
! style=background:white colspan=9 |
|-  style="background:#CCFFCC;"
| 2017-12-02||Win ||align=left|  || P-1 Chang Tournament, Semi Final || Thailand ||KO||  ||
|-  style="background:#CCFFCC;"
| 2017-12-02||Win ||align=left|  || P-1 Chang Tournament, Quarter Final || Thailand ||KO||  ||
|-  style="background:#CCFFCC;"
| 2017-11-17||Win ||align=left|  ||  || Phatthalung, Thailand ||KO|| 1 ||
|-  style="background:#FFBBBB;"
| 2017-09-17||Loss ||align=left| Tone Sor.Tragoonpetch || Max Muay Thai|| Thailand ||Decision  || 3 ||3:00
|-  style="background:#CCFFCC;"
| 2017-08-13||Win ||align=left| Marseemok Chor Kowyuhaisuzu || Max Muay Thai|| Thailand ||KO|| 2 ||
|-  style="background:#CCFFCC;"
| 2017-07-23||Win ||align=left| Chalampetch Pojseemummuang || Max Muay Thai|| Thailand ||KO (Straight to the Body)|| 1 ||
|-  style="background:#CCFFCC;"
| 2017-07-07||Win ||align=left|  || Bangla Stadium || Thailand ||KO || 1 ||
|-  style="background:#FFBBBB;"
| 2017-05-15||Loss ||align=left| ||  ||  Thailand ||TKO (Doctor Stoppage/Broken Hand ||  ||
|-  style="background:#CCFFCC;"
| 2017-04-22||Win ||align=left| || Max Muay Thai|| Bangkok, Thailand ||KO|| 2 ||
|-  style="background:#CCFFCC;"
| 2017-04-01||Win ||align=left| ||  || Bangkok, Thailand ||KO || 2 ||
|-  style="background:#CCFFCC;"
| 2017-03-20||Win ||align=left| || Patong Stadium || Pa Tong, Thailand ||KO ||  ||
|-  style="background:#CCFFCC;"
| 2017-02-17||Win ||align=left| Chornpetch Kornsarakarm|| Max Muay Thai|| Thailand ||KO (Left Hook)|| 1 ||
|-  style="background:#CCFFCC;"
| 2016||Win ||align=left| || Patong Stadium || Pa Tong, Thailand ||TKO (High Kick)||  ||
|-
| colspan=9 | Legend:

See also 
List of male kickboxers
List of WPMF male world champions

References

Brazilian male kickboxers
Living people
1995 births
ONE Championship kickboxers
Sportspeople from Fortaleza